Mera Hou Chongba or Mera Waayungba or Mera Thaomei Thaanba is the cultural festival of  solidarity of Manipur, celebrated by every indigenous ethnic groups, including the Meitei people and the rest of hilly tribes. The day falls on the 15th lunar day of Mera month of the Meitei calendar. The main location for the celebration of the festival is at the Sana Konung, the Royal Palace of Manipur. On this day, all the hill tribes came down to the valley of Imphal, and gather at the Royal Palace, and show their cultural dances and other art forms. The day ends with a grand feast, held together with the Meitei people and the tribes, to show solitude, oness of all the ethnic groups in the region.

See also
 Sajibu Cheiraoba
 Ningol Chakouba
 Heikru Hidongba
 Yaoshang
 Imoinu Iratpa
 Panthoibi Iratpa
 Mera Chaorel Houba

References

Festivals in Manipur